Five Years Later is an album by Ralph Towner and guitarists John Abercrombie that was recorded in 1981 and released by ECM in 1982.

Reception 
The Allmusic review by Scott Yanow gave the album 2½ stars, stating, "One can easily tell the two guitarists apart, since Abercrombie mostly plays electric and has a more forceful sound, while Towner's solos are usually more introverted. They perform three of Towner's songs, a pair of Abercrombie originals, and three collaborations. Although the interaction tends to be fairly quiet, there is a lot of subtle passion."  The Rolling Stone Jazz Record Guide said, "another album of spectacular duets".

Track listing

Personnel
 John Abercrombie – electric guitar, acoustic guitar, twelve-string guitar, mandolin 
 Ralph Towner – twelve-string guitar, classical guitar

References

ECM Records albums
Ralph Towner albums
John Abercrombie (guitarist) albums
1982 albums
Albums produced by Manfred Eicher